The Regional Bell Operating Companies (RBOC) are the result of United States v. AT&T, the U.S. Department of Justice antitrust suit against the former American Telephone & Telegraph Company (later known as AT&T Corp.). On January 8, 1982, AT&T Corp. settled the suit and agreed to divest its local exchange service operating companies. Effective January 1, 1984, AT&T Corp.'s local operations were split into seven independent Regional Bell Operating Companies known as the Baby Bells. 

RBOCs were originally known as Regional Holding Companies (RHCs). Currently, three companies have the RBOCs as predecessors: AT&T, Verizon, and Lumen Technologies. Some other companies are holding onto smaller segments of the companies.

Baby Bells
A baby bell is local telephone company in the United States that was in existence at the time of the breakup of AT&T into the resulting Regional Bell Operating Companies (RBOCs), also known as the "Baby Bells."  Sometimes also referred to as an "ILEC" (Incumbent Local Exchange Carrier) they were the former Bell System or Independent Telephone Company responsible for providing local telephone exchange services in a specified geographic area.
After the Modification of Final Judgment, the resulting Baby Bells were originally named:

 Ameritech
 Bell Atlantic 
 BellSouth 
 NYNEX 
 Pacific Telesis 
 Southwestern Bell
 US West 

Prior to 1984, AT&T Corp. also held investments in two smaller and otherwise independent companies, Cincinnati Bell and Southern New England Telephone (SNET). Following the 1984 breakup, these became fully independent as well. All nine local-exchange holding companies were assigned a share of the rights to the Bell trademark.

Shared trademarks 

After divestiture, AT&T Corp. was prohibited from using the Bell name or logo (with the notable exception of AT&T's Bell Laboratories) and those trademarks which would be shared by the RBOCs and the two companies AT&T partially owned. Since the BellSouth acquisition, Cincinnati Bell has been the only former AT&T associated company still carrying the "Bell" name.

Additionally, Bell Canada, the former Bell Telephone Company of Canada (founded in 1880) and which started separating from the Bell System in 1956, and completely by 1975, continues to use the "Bell" trademarks, which it owns outright in Canada.

Verizon continued to use the Bell logo on its payphones (including former GTE payphones), hard hats, trucks, and buildings, likely intending to display continued use in order to maintain the company's trademark rights. Following the company updating its logo in 2015 and subsequent reimaging of its trucks, the Bell logo has since been removed.

Malheur Bell, an autonomous local phone company owned by Qwest, used the Bell name and logo until its merger into Qwest in 2009.

Apart from historical documents, AT&T does not presently make active use of the Bell marks. Its local exchange companies have retained the "Bell" names; however, they have been doing business under other names since 2002. Many of these names are still listed with the US Patent and Trademark Office as current trademarks, since these names are still considered in use.

Mergers

Many of these companies have since merged; by the end of 2000, there were only three of the original Baby Bells left in the United States. After the 1984 breakup, part of AT&T Corp.'s Bell Labs was split off into Bellcore, which would serve as an R&D and standards body for the seven Baby Bells. In 1997, Bellcore was acquired by Science Applications International Corporation where it became a wholly owned subsidiary and was renamed Telcordia.

AT&T Inc.  
Southwestern Bell Corporation, which changed its name to SBC Communications in 1995, acquired Pacific Telesis in 1997, SNET in 1998, and Ameritech in 1999. In February 2005, SBC announced its plans to acquire former parent company AT&T Corp. for over $16 billion. SBC took on the AT&T name upon merger closure on November 18, 2005.  SBC began trading as AT&T Inc. on December 1, 2005, but began re-branding as early as November 21. In 2006 AT&T Inc. purchased BellSouth.

Verizon Communications 
In 1997, NYNEX was acquired by Bell Atlantic (taking the Bell Atlantic name), which later, in 2000, acquired GTE, the largest independent telephone company. Bell Atlantic later changed its name to Verizon that same year.

In 2005, following a protracted bidding war with rival RBOC Qwest, Verizon announced that it would acquire long-distance company MCI.  The Verizon and MCI merger closed on January 6, 2006.

Eventually, Verizon became the largest mobile in the United States, surpassing T-Mobile and even AT&T.

Lumen Technologies, Inc. 
Lumen Technologies, Inc. was originally Century Telephone (CenturyTel), and took the Centurylink name in 2009 when it acquired Embarq, the former local operations of Sprint Nextel, which also included the former operations of Centel. The company, as CenturyTel, had acquired some Wisconsin Bell lines from Ameritech in 1998.

Qwest, a Denver-based fiber optics long-distance company, had taken over US West in 2000. CenturyLink announced in April 2010 its intent to buy Qwest for US$10.6 billion. The transaction was completed in April 2011. In August 2011, the Qwest branding was retired and replaced by that of CenturyLink. CenturyLink rebranded to Lumen Technologies in September 2020.

Other related companies

AltaFiber 
The former independent Bell System franchisee Cincinnati Bell, which was not part of the 1984 divestiture because AT&T held only a minority stake in the company, remains independent of the RBOCs. In December 2019, Cincinnati Bell announced that Brookfield Infrastructure Partners would acquire the company for $2.6 billion. On September 7, 2021, Macquarie Infrastructure and Real Assets completed its purchase of Cincinnati Bell, Inc. and later rebranded the company name to AltaFiber.

Consolidated Communications 
FairPoint Communications, an independent provider based in North Carolina, acquired Northern New England Telephone Operations. NNETO is an operating company split from the original New England Telephone to serve access lines in Maine and New Hampshire. The sale of these lines by Verizon to FairPoint closed in 2008. Telephone Operating Company of Vermont, a company created following FairPoint's acquisition, was an operating company wholly owned by Northern New England Telephone Operations. In December 2016 FairPoint was purchased by Consolidated Communications, and the combined company operates under the Consolidated Communications name.

Frontier Communications 
In 2010, Frontier Communications acquired Frontier West Virginia, one of the original Bell Operating Companies formerly known as the Chesapeake and Potomac Telephone Company of West Virginia, in a larger deal including some former GTE companies with Verizon Communications. In December 2013, AT&T agreed to sell SNET to Frontier, with the sale closing in the second half of 2014.
On April 1, 2016, Frontier Communications (FTR) completed the data conversions from the Verizon systems for the remaining three largest former GTE properties: California, Florida and Texas.
On May 1, 2020, Frontier Communications (FTR) completed the sale of its Nothwest Regional companies of Idaho, Montana, Oregon and Washington to Ziply Fiber in an effort to avoid Chapter 11 bankruptcy. This move did not solve Frontier Communications financial problems resulting in a Chapter 11 Bankruptcy filing on April 14, 2020. Frontier went public again on May 4, 2021, with FYBR as its trading symbol on NASDAQ, after changing its name to "Frontier Communications Parent".

See also

Breakup of the Bell System
Competitive local exchange carrier (CLEC)
Incumbent local exchange carrier (ILEC)
Local access and transport area (LATA)

References

External links
 Pre-divestiture RBOC map (from Bell System Memorial)
 Table of RBOC changes (from Bell System Memorial)
 Note: Does NOT include Verizon spinoffs.
 Bell Operating Companies (from Bell System Memorial)
 Qwest Communications
 AT&T Inc.
 Verizon Communications
 Cincinnati Bell
 Boston.com - FairPoint-Verizon deal comes to a close on Monday

1982 in the United States
Bell System
Bell